FreeJ is a modular software vision mixer for Linux systems. It is capable of real-time video manipulation, for amateur and professional uses. It can be used as an instrument in the fields of dance theater, veejaying and television. FreeJ supports the input of multiple layers of video footage, which can be filtered through special-effect-chains, and then mixed for output.

History 
Denis Rojo (aka Jaromil) is the original author, and as of 2013 is the current maintainer.  Since 0.7 was released, Silvano Galliani (aka kysucix) joined the core development team, implementing several new enhancements.

Features 

FreeJ can be operated in real-time from a command line console (S-Lang), and also remotely operated over the network via an SSH connection.  The software provides an interface for behavior-scripting (currently accessible through JavaScript). Also, it can be used to render media to multiple screens, remote setups, encoders, and live Internet stream servers.

FreeJ can overlay, mask, transform and filter multiple layers of footage on the screen. It supports an unlimited number of layers that can be mixed, regardless of the source. It can read input from varied sources: movie files, webcams, TV cards, images, renders and Adobe Flash animations.

FreeJ can produce a stream to an icecast server with the video being mixed and audio grabbed from soundcard. The resulting video is accessible to any computer able to decode media encoded with the theora codec.

The console interface of FreeJ is accessible via SSH and can be run as a background process. The remote interface offers simultaneous access from multiple remote locations.

References

External links 
 

Free video software
Television technology